André Auffray (born Alexandre Offray; 2 September 1884 – 3 November 1953) was a French racing cyclist. At the 1908 Olympics he won a gold medal in the tandem, together with Maurice Schilles, and a bronze in the 5000 m event; he also competed in the individual sprint and in the 1,980 yard team pursuit. In sprint events, he won the Paris championships in 1907, placing third in 1908 and 1909, and placed second at the world championships.

References

1884 births
French male cyclists
Olympic cyclists of France
Olympic gold medalists for France
Olympic bronze medalists for France
Cyclists at the 1908 Summer Olympics
1953 deaths
People from Puteaux
Olympic medalists in cycling
Medalists at the 1908 Summer Olympics
French track cyclists
Sportspeople from Hauts-de-Seine
Cyclists from Île-de-France